The Three Lakes Wildlife Management Area (not to be confused with Three Lakes near Miami) is the second largest remaining expanse of dry prairie in the United States.

The management area is situated near Lake Kissimmee, Lake Jackson and Lake Marian. It comprises  including parts of the Kissimmee Prairie. The area is open for recreational uses including hunting, fishing, hiking, and birding.

The area's wildlife includes deer, bobcat, mottled duck, and wild turkey. The management area is also a year-round habitat for the bald eagle.

References

Protected areas of Osceola County, Florida
Wildlife management areas of Florida